Gerald Fuchsbichler (20 April 1944 – 23 February 1995) was an Austrian former international footballer. He was the older brother of Erwin Fuchsbichler, who was also a goalkeeper for the Austria national football team.

After starting his career at Kapfenberger SV, when the club was relegated from the Bundesliga at the end of the 1966/67 season, Fuchsbichler signed for Rapid Wien for 150,000 schillings (€10,900).  During his time at Rapid Wien the team won the League championship, and Fuchsbichler was called up to the Austria national football team. During the 1970–71 season, Gerald's brother Erwin Fuchsbichler, also a goalkeeper, signed for Rapid Wien. In 1971 Gerard was transferred to  Wiener Sport-Club for 700,000 Schillings (€50,871.00).

After retiring, he took up an office job at Nordmende.
He died in 1995 of cancer of the jaw and tongue.

References

1944 births
1995 deaths
Association football goalkeepers
Austrian footballers
Austria international footballers
Kapfenberger SV players
SK Rapid Wien players
Wiener Sport-Club players
SC Untersiebenbrunn players